Joseph Andrew Konrath (born March 29, 1970 in Skokie, Illinois) is an American fiction writer working in the mystery, thriller, and horror genres. He writes as J. A. Konrath and Jack Kilborn. In 2011 Konrath was named one of the "5 eBook Authors To Watch" by Mediabistro.com's Dianna Dilworth.

Biography
Konrath graduated from Columbia College in Chicago in 1992 and spent the next 12 years garnering close to five hundred rejections for nine unpublished novels. His tenth book, Whiskey Sour, was picked up by Hyperion in 2003 and was the first in a series featuring Lt. Jacqueline "Jack" Daniels of the Chicago Police Department. He's since published dozens of short stories and articles, been translated into eight languages, and edited an anthology called These Guns for Hire for Bleak House Books. In 2010 the seventh book in the Jack Daniels series was picked up for publication by AmazonEncore.  Konrath currently lives in Schaumburg, Illinois, a western suburb of Chicago. J.A. Konrath teaches writing at Dupage College, Illinois.

Awards
Konrath has won the 2005 Derringer Award for Flash Fiction and the 2006 Bob Kellog Humanitarian Award.

Writing
Konrath is a big advocate of self-publishing and for self-promotion, believing that writers must play a large part in marketing their own books. He's also known for having an outspoken view on the publishing industry, blogging about topics such as the 2012 accusations by some industry pundits that Amazon has endangered book sales.

Bibliography

Novels
Afraid (2008) - Under the pseudonym Jack Kilborn
A Shot of Tequila (2010) - A Jack Daniels Thriller
Endurance (2010) - Under the pseudonym Jack Kilborn
Trapped (2010) - Under the pseudonym Jack Kilborn

Jack Daniels series
Whiskey Sour (2004)
Bloody Mary (2005)
Rusty Nail (2006)
Dirty Martini (2007)
Fuzzy Navel (2008)
Cherry Bomb (2009)
Shaken (2010)
Stirred (with Blake Crouch (2012))
Lady 52 (with Jude Hardin (2014))
Rum Runner (2016)
Last Call (2016)
White Russian (2017)
Shot Girl (2019)
Chaser (2019)
Old Fashioned (2020)

Tie-in stories
"On the Rocks" (Featuring Jack Daniels, first published in Ellery Queen's Mystery Magazine (EQMM))
"With a Twist" (Featuring Jack Daniels, EQMM)
"Body Shots" (Featuring Jack Daniels, Amazon Shorts)
"Whelp Wanted" (Featuring Harry McGlade, Futures Mysterious Anthology Magazine)
"Taken to the Cleaners" (Featuring Harry McGlade, The Strand Magazine)
"Street Music" (Featuring Phineas Troutt, EQMM)
"Epitaph" (Featuring Phineas Troutt, Thriller edited by James Patterson)
"Suffer" (Featuring Phineas Troutt, EQMM)
"Bereaved" (Featuring Phineas Troutt, These Guns for Hire, edited by J. A. Konrath)
"Potshot" (Featuring Herb Benedict, Amazon Shorts)
"The One That Got Away" (Featuring The Gingerbread Man, Amazon Shorts)
"The Necro File" (Featuring Harry McGlade, first published in Like A Chinese Tattoo)
"Last Request" (Featuring Phineas Troutt)
"Overproof" (Featuring Jack Daniels, first published in Chicago Blues edited by Libby Fischer Hellmann)
"School Daze" (Phineas Troutt)

The above are all collected in the book "Jack Daniels Stories".

"Suckers" (Featuring Harry McGlade) novella co-written by Jeff Strand
"Truck Stop"
"Floaters"
"Planter's Punch"
"Burners"
"Banana Hammock"
"Babe on Board"

Other short stories
"The Agreement" (Alfred Hitchcock's Mystery Magazine (AHMM))
"Symbios" (Apex Digest)
"Forgiveness" (Cemetery Dance)
"Light Drizzle" (Crimespree Magazine)
"The Shed" (Surreal Magazine)
"Finicky Eater" (Horror Garage Magazine)
"The Screaming" (The Many Faces of Van Helsing, edited by Jeanne Cavelos)
"Don’t Press That Button!" (James Bond in the 21st Century, edited by Glenn Yeffeth)
"The Bag" (Cold Flesh, edited by Paul Fry)
"The Big Guys, He Bites, A Matter of Taste" (Small Bites, edited by Garrett Peck and Keith Gouveia)
"Appalachian Lullabye" (Requiem for the Radioactive Monkey, edited by John Weagley)
"Lying Eyes" (Twisted Tongue Magazine)
"Redux" (Spooks, edited by Tina L. Jens & John Everson)
"The Conversation" (Hard Luck Stories)
"A Fistful of Cozy" (Shots)
"Mr. Pull Ups" (Tales From the Red Lion, edited by Tina L. Jens and John Weagley)
"Punishment" (Like A Chinese Tattoo, edited by Bill Breedlove)
"The Confession" (Like A Chinese Tattoo, edited by Bill Breedlove)
"Them's Good Eats" (Gratia Placenti, edited by Jason Sizemore & Gill Ainsworth)
"Lying Eyes" (Twisted Tongue #2)
"The Sound of Blunder" co-written with F. Paul Wilson (Blood Lite, edited by Kevin J. Anderson)
"S.A." (Wolfsbane & Mistletoe, edited by Charlaine Harris & Toni L.P. Kelner)

Other self-published fiction
"Origin" - A thriller about Satan being studied in a secret government compound (Kindle edition April 2009; paperback November 2010).
"The List" - A thriller about a cop who discovers he, and several others, are clones of famous historical figures (Kindle edition April 2009; paperback July 2010).
"Disturb" - A thriller about a new legal insomnia drug with deadly side effects (Kindle edition April 2009; paperback November 2010).
"65 Proof" - A collection of short stories (Kindle edition April 2009; paperback March 2011).

Self-published non-fiction
 "The Newbie's Guide to Publishing (Everything A Writer Needs To Know)" - Kindle edition April 2010.
 "Be the Monkey - Ebooks and Self-Publishing: A Dialog Between Authors Barry Eisler and Joe Konrath"  -  Co-written with Barry Eisler (Kindle edition June 2011).

References

External links

Official blog

1970 births
21st-century American novelists
American thriller writers
American mystery writers
Living people
Writers from Chicago
Columbia College Chicago alumni
American male novelists
People from Skokie, Illinois
21st-century American male writers
Novelists from Illinois